Farewell, Farewell, Eugene was a play by John Vari.

Plot
Two reclusive sisters send greeting cards to the outside world through their cousin, for which they make money that goes into a fund to visit their brother in Africa. Various complications, including a runaway marriage, an abandoned baby's appearance on a doorstep, and a revealing letter follow.

Adaptations
It was adapted for British television and aired on the BBC on the 23 July 1959.

1960 Australian TV Version

It was adapted for Australian TV in 1960.

Plot
Two spinsters try to earn enough money to join their nephew in Africa.

Cast
Letty Craydon as Minerva
Nancye Stewart as Florence
Moya O'Sullivan as Penny the niece	
Phillip Ross as Mick Delaney	
Ron Shand as Mr Bosworth
Dora Norris as Mrs Bosworth
Beryl Marshall as Queenie
Don Barkham as Willie
Audrey Teesdale as Mrs Slack

Reception
The Sydney Morning Herald called it " a refreshing piece of work, in general terms competently assembled, and with one performance in particular adding a final touch of assurance. This was Letty Craydon's picture... [she] so thoroughly sketched the characteristics of a skittish, domineered, furtively-imbibing old lady that she seemed to have grown into the part."

The Sunday Herald called it "a pleasant bit of viewing."

References

External links

1960s Australian television plays